The Arizona Wildcats softball team represents the University of Arizona in NCAA Division I Softball. Having claimed eight national championships (second only to UCLA), the team is one of the most successful in the history of the sport. It plays its home games at Rita Hillenbrand Memorial Stadium in Tucson, AZ. The team was formerly coached by Mike Candrea, who began his UA coaching career in 1986 and announced his retirement on June 8, 2021.  He retired as the all time winningest coach in Collegiate softball history with 1,674 wins, more Collegiate national titles with 8 and the fourth most wins of any coach in any NCAA sport.

History

1974 to 1985

The Arizona Wildcats officially began softball play in 1974 under head coach Judy Spray  in the Intermountain Conference. The first team in the school's history went 11–3 and participated in the Association for Intercollegiate Athletics for Women (AIAW) Women's College World Series (WCWS). The AIAW and Amateur Softball Association co-sponsored the Women's College World Series through 1982 (the NCAA held a separate tournament in 1982 when it began organizing women's softball). The 1975 team also played in the WCWS. In 1977, the Wildcats finished second in the WCWS, just missing out on winning the tournament. In 1979, the team once again qualified for the WCWS. However, after the 1979 season, the Wildcats failed to make the postseason again until 1987. From 1981 to 1986, the Wildcats were members of the Western Collegiate Athletic Association (WCAA), which renamed itself the Pacific West Conference (PacWest; not to be confused with the current NCAA Division II conference) for its final season. The WCAA/PacWest folded after the 1986 season when the then-Pac-10, home to all five of the final PacWest members, began sponsoring women's sports.

Mike Candrea era

Mike Candrea was hired for the 1986 season to build the Wildcats program. In his first season, the Wildcats won 29 games and missed out on the postseason. However, in 1987, Arizona won 42 games and made the NCAA tournament for the first time since the NCAA began sponsoring the sport. In 1988, Candrea guided the Wildcats to 54 wins and an appearance in the Women's College World Series where the team finished tied for third place. From 1988 to 2003, the Wildcats made sixteen straight appearances in the Women's College World Series. Arizona's first national championship season came in 1991. The Wildcats went 56–16 that year. In 1992, the Wildcats won the school's first Pac-10 title and finished runner-up at the Women's College World Series. The Wildcats continued their hot streak throughout the 1990s winning national championships in 1993, 1994, 1996, and 1997. The 1994 team went 64–3 and was ranked #1 throughout the year. Arizona also claimed the Pac-10 championship in 1994, 1995, 1997, and 1998. The Wildcats experienced continued success in the 2000s winning another national title in 2001 after finishing that year 65–4. The Wildcats won the 2001, 2003, 2004, 2005, and 2007 conference titles. Candrea left Arizona to coach the USA National team in the 2004 Olympics, and Larry Ray was named the interim coach for the 2004 season. The 2004 team won 55 games but lost to the Oklahoma Sooners in the Regionals, which marked the first time since 1987 that the Wildcats did not make it to the Women's College World Series. Candrea returned in 2005, and the Wildcats again returned to Oklahoma City for the World Series. The 2006 Arizona team defeated the Northwestern Wildcats to capture the Wildcats' seventh national title and their first since 2001. The 2007 Wildcats repeated as national champions by defeating the Tennessee Lady Volunteers in the championship series after losing the opening game of the series. Larry Ray again was tagged the interim coach in 2008 when Candrea coached the U.S. National Team at the 2008 Olympics. The 2008 team again made it to the Women's College World Series finishing tied for seventh in the eight team field. The Wildcats participated in the World Series in both 2009 and 2010 finishing tied for seventh and second respectively. In 2011, the Wildcats were eliminated in the NCAA Super Regional play by the Oklahoma Sooners.

Caitlin Lowe-Nagy era
Following the retirement of former head coach Mike Candrea, Lowe–Nagy was announced as the next head coach of the Arizona Wildcats softball program.  Lowe–Nagy spent the last nine seasons under Candrea following a professional player with the USSSA Pride and internationally with Team USA, winning Silver Medal in the 2004 Summer Olympics.  She also was a former player under Candrea, playing from 2004–2007 & had one of the most decorated careers of any player in Arizona history.  A two-time national champion in 2006 & 2007, as well as numerous Arizona records such as: second in batting average (.446), fourth in hits (351), fourth in triples (12), seventh in runs scored (242) and first in stolen bases (156). She was unanimously named the greatest centerfielder of all time, both by a fan vote and by the 7Innings Podcast crew in its Greatest Softball Team of All-Time.  Lowe–Nagy is one of only six Wildcat players to be named an NFCA All-American in each of her four years with the program and joined Leah Braatz (1994, 95, 97, 98) as the only player in Arizona history to be awarded first-team All-America all four years.

All-Americans by position
Pitcher: Teresa Cherry, Debby Day, Julie Jones, Susie Parra, Carrie Dolan, Nancy Evans, Becky Lemke, Jennie Finch, Alicia Hollowell, Taryne Mowatt, Kenzie Fowler, Danielle O'Toole and Taylor McQuillin
Catcher: Jody Miller-Pruitt, Leah Braatz, Leticia Pineda, Lindsey Collins, Stacie Chambers, Chelsea Goodacre, and Dejah Mulipola
First Base: Alyssa Palomino-Cardoza, Amy Chellevold, Hallie Wilson, Julie Jones, Leah O'Brien, Leneah Manuma, Leticia Pineda and Laine Roth
Second Base: Karen Fellenz and Jenny Dalton
Shortstop: Julie Standering, Laura Espinoza, Lovie Jung, Kellie Fox and Kristie Fox
Third Base: Nicki Dennis, Krista Gomez, Toni Mascarenas, and Jenae Leles
Left Field: Vivian Holm, Alison Johnsen, Lauren Bauer, Brandi Shriver, Nicole Giordano, Autumn Champion, and Brittany Lastrapes
Center Field: Jamie Heggen, Leah O’Brien, Brandi Shriver, Alison Johnsen, Lauren Bauer, Caitlin Lowe, and Alyssa Palomino-Cardoza
Right Field: Brandi Shriver, Nicole Giordano, and Courtney Fossatti
Designated Player: Wendy Allen

Head coaches

Year-by-year results

NCAA Tournament seeding history
National seeding began in 2005. The Arizona Wildcats have been a national seed 14 of the 16 tournaments.  Seeds in bold were national title seasons.

National championships

Retired jerseys

Wildcats of note

National awards

Honda Softball Award
 1993-94 – Susie Parra
 1995-96 – Jenny Dalton
 1997-98 – Nancy Evans
 2000-01 – Jennie Finch
 2001-02 – Jennie Finch

USA Softball Female Athlete of the Year
 2009 Jennie Finch
 2015 Kellie Fox
 2015 Alyssa Palomino-Cardoza (Junior Athlete of the Year)

ESPY Award
 2007 Taryne Mowatt - Best Female Athlete, Best Female College Athlete

Lowe's Senior Class Award
 2007 Caitlin Lowe

NFCA Golden Shoe Award
 2007 Caitlin Lowe

NFCA Catcher of the Year
 1997 Leah Braatz
 1998 Leah Braatz
 2019 Dejah Mulipola
 2021 Dejah Mulipola

Coach of the Year
 1986 Mike Candrea, Pacific-West co-honor
 1987 Mike Candrea, Pac-10
 1988 Mike Candrea, Northwest Region, Pac-10
 1994 Mike Candrea, NSCA Div. I, National Coach of the Year, Pacific Region, Pac-10
 1995 Mike Candrea, Pacific Region
 1996 Mike Candrea, Speedline/NFCA Division I, National Coach of the Year
 1997 Mike Candrea, Speedline/NFCA Division I, National Coach of the Year, Pac-10, Pacific-Region
 1998 Mike Candrea, Pac-10
 2000 Mike Candrea, Pac-10 co-honor
 2001 Mike Candrea, Pac-10 co-honor
 2002 Mike Candrea, Pac-10
 2003 Mike Candrea, Pac-10
 2007 Mike Candrea, Pac-10 Staff, NFCA Division I
 2017 Mike Candrea, Pac-12 Staff, NFCA West Region

Conference awards
Pac-10 Conference Medal
 1989 Stacy Engel
 1995 Amy Chellevold
 1996 Jenny Dalton
 1997 Leah O'Brien
 1998 Nancy Evans
 2001 Lauren Bauer
 2002 Jennie Finch
 2003 Lovie Jung
 2004 Wendy Allen

Pac-12 Player of the Year
 1994 Susie Parra
 1995 Laura Espinoza
 1996 Jenny Dalton
 1997 Alison McCutcheon
1998 Alison McCutcheon
2005 Caitlin Lowe
2017 Katiyana Mauga

Pac-12 Pitcher of the Year
 2001 Jennie Finch
 2002 Jennie Finch
 2004 Alicia Hollowell
 2017 Danielle O'Toole

Pac-12 Freshman of the Year
 1994 Leah Braatz
 1998 Toni Mascarenas
 2002 Lovie Jung
 2003 Alicia Hollowell
 2004 Caitlin Lowe
 2014 Katiyana Mauga
 2021 Janelle Meoño

Pac-12 Defensive Player of the Year
 2007 Caitlin Lowe
 2014 Kellie Fox
 2015 Hallie Wilson

Pac-12 Scholar Athlete of the Year
 2007 Kelsey Rodriguez
CoSIDA Academic All-Americans

 1984 Kathy Jo Lanford
 1985 Lisa Bernstein
 1985 Kathy Jo Lanford
 1986 Lisa Bernstein
 1994 Leah O'Brien
 1995 Jenny Dalton
 1995 Leah O'Brien 
 1996 Jenny Dalton
 1997 Leah O'Brien
 1998 Nancy Evans
 2004 Wendy Allen
 2006 Autumn Champion 
 2010 K'Lee Arredondo 
 2019 Tamara Statman

All-Americans
Arizona has had 109 All-Americans, 64 of which have been First-Team.

 1984 – Karen Fellenz (1st-Team)
 1988 – Teresa Cherry (2nd-Team)
 1990 – Nicki Dennis (2nd-Team)
 1990 – Julie Jones (2nd-Team)
 1990 – Vivian Holm (1st-Team)
 1991 – Debby Day (3rd-Team)
 1991 – Julie Jones (2nd-Team)
 1991 – Julie Standering (1st-Team)
 1992 – Amy Chellevold (3rd-Team)
 1992 – Debby Day (1st-Team)
 1992 – Jamie Heggen (2nd-Team)
 1992 – Jody Miller-Pruitt (1st-Team)
 1992 – Susie Parra (2nd-Team)
 1993 – Amy Chellevold (2nd-Team)
 1993 – Laura Espinoza (2nd-Team)
 1993 – Jamie Heggen (1st-Team)
 1993 – Susie Parra (1st-Team)
 1993 – Jody Pruitt (2nd-Team)
 1994 – Amy Chellevold (1st-Team)
 1994 – Jenny Dalton (1st-Team)
 1994 – Laura Espinoza (1st-Team)
 1994 – Leah Braatz (1st-Team)
 1994 – Leah O’Brien (1st-Team)
 1994 – Susie Parra (1st-Team)
 1995 – Amy Chellevold (1st-Team)
 1995 – Carrie Dolan (1st-Team)
 1995 – Jenny Dalton (1st-Team)
 1995 – Laura Espinoza (1st-Team)
 1995 – Leah Braatz (1st-Team)
 1995 – Leah O’Brien (1st-Team)
 1996 – Alison McCutcheon (1st-Team)
 1996 – Brandi Shriver (2nd-Team)
 1996 – Carrie Dolan (2nd-Team)
 1996 – Jenny Dalton (1st-Team)
 1996 – Krista Gomez (2nd-Team)
 1996 – Leticia Pineda (1st-Team)
 1997 – Alison McCutcheon (1st-Team)
 1997 – Leah Braatz (1st-Team)
 1997 – Leah O’Brien (1st-Team)
 1997 – Leticia Pineda (1st-Team)
 1997 – Nancy Evans (1st-Team)
 1998 – Alison McCutcheon (1st-Team)
 1998 – Lauren Bauer (1st-Team)
 1998 – Leah Braatz (1st-Team)
 1998 – Leticia Pineda (1st-Team)
 1998 – Nancy Evans (1st-Team) 
 1998 – Toni Mascarenas (1st-Team)
 1999 – Becky Lemke (3rd-Team)
 1999 – Lauren Bauer (3rd-Team)
 1999 – Nicole Giordano (3rd-Team)
 2000 – Jennie Finch (1st-Team)
 2000 – Lauren Bauer (2nd-Team)
 2000 – Lindsey Collins (3rd-Team)
 2000 – Nicole Giordano (2nd-Team)
 2000 – Toni Mascarenas (2nd-Team)
 2001 – Jennie Finch (1st-Team)
 2001 – Lauren Bauer (1st-Team)
 2001 – Leneah Manuma (1st-Team)
 2001 – Nicole Giordano (3rd-Team)
 2001 – Toni Mascarenas (1st-Team)
 2002 – Jennie Finch (1st-Team)
 2002 – Leneah Manuma (1st-Team)
 2003 – Alicia Hollowell (1st-Team)
 2003 – Autumn Champion (1st-Team)
 2003 – Courtney Fossatti (2nd-Team)
 2003 – Lovie Jung (1st-Team)
 2004 – Alicia Hollowell (1st-Team)
 2004 – Autumn Champion (1st-Team)
 2004 – Caitlin Lowe (1st-Team)
 2004 – Wendy Allen (1st-Team)
 2005 – Alicia Hollowell (1st-Team)
 2005 – Caitlin Lowe (1st-Team)
 2005 – Kristie Fox (1st-Team)
 2006 – Alicia Hollowell (1st-Team)
 2006 – Caitlin Lowe (1st-Team)
 2006 – Kristie Fox (1st-Team)
 2007 – Caitlin Lowe (1st-Team)
 2007 – Taryne Mowatt (2nd-Team)
 2008 – Brittany Lastrapes (3rd-Team)
 2008 – Laine Roth (3rd-Team)
 2009 – Brittany Lastrapes (1st-Team)
 2009 – Jenae Leles (3rd-Team)
 2009 – Stacie Chambers (3rd-Team)
 2010 – Brittany Lastrapes (1st-Team)
 2010 – Kenzie Fowler (1st-Team)
 2010 – K’Lee Arredondo (2nd-Team)
 2010 – Stacie Chambers (2nd-Team)
 2011 – Brigette Del Ponte (2nd-Team)
 2011 – Brittany Lastrapes (1st-Team)
 2011 – Kenzie Fowler (2nd-Team)
 2014 – Hallie Wilson (1st-Team)
 2014 – Kellie Fox (3rd-Team)
 2015 – Chelsea Goodacre (2nd-Team)
 2015 – Katiyana Mauga (3rd-Team)
 2015 – Kellie Fox (3rd-Team)
 2017 – Danielle O'Toole (1st-Team)
 2017 – Jessie Harper (1st-Team)
 2017 – Katiyana Mauga (2nd-Team)
 2017 – Mo Mercado (2nd-Team)
 2018 – Alyssa Palomino-Cardoza (1st-Team)
 2019 – Taylor McQuillin (1st-Team)
 2019 – Dejah Mulipola (1st-Team)
 2019 – Alyssa Palomino-Cardoza (1st-Team)
 2019 – Reyna Carranco (2nd-Team)
 2019 – Jessie Harper (2nd-Team)
 2021 – Dejah Mulipola (1st-Team)
 2021 – Alyssa Denham (3rd-Team)
 2021 – Jessie Harper (3rd-Team)
 2021 – Janelle Meoño (3rd-Team)

All-Time Statistical leaders

† indicates Pac-12 record

‡ indicates NCAA record

See also
2006 Women's College World Series
2007 Women's College World Series
List of NCAA Division I softball programs

References

External links